Saint Anstrudis (Anstrude, Austru, or Austrude) (b. unknown - 688) was the daughter of Saint Blandinus and Saint Sadalberga, the founder of the Abbey of St. John at Laon. She was also the sister of Saint .

Background
In Merovingian Gaul, founding a monastery was a noble family's way of expressing and reinforcing its power. The founder gave the land, and retained the right to appoint the abbot or abbess, but also guaranteed its protection. Regine Le Jan describes it as part of the family's honor. The ruling abbot/abbess was frequently a family member and controlled access to the premises, a matter of some importance during a time of recurrent feuds and power struggles between neighboring families. They served as a power base for families, and as such were not exempt from the political disturbances of the time.

Life
When St. Sadalberga withdrew from the world to become abbess at the convent, Anstrudis went with her. Sadalberga died in 655. Before her death, in order to ensure the stability of the abbey, Sadalberga determined to turn over its direction to her daughter as soon as Anstrudis reached the age of twenty. Anstrudis was then consecrated abbess. She was noted for the care for her sisters, her all-night vigils, and her self-imposed austerities. Except on Sundays and on Christmas Day she never took any nourishment but one moderate refection at three o’clock in the afternoon, and on fast-days after sunset.

Her tenure as abbess was marked by the unsettled political conditions of the period. Anstrudis was caught up in the dynastic struggle between Dagobert II of Austrasia and Ebroin, mayor of the place of Neustria, who supported Theuderic III.

Her brother Baldwin was treacherously assassinated while attempting to negotiate a settlement of some dispute regarding the convent. She herself was accused of wrongdoing by Ebroin. However, he was at length softened by her intrepid constancy and virtue and innocence, and from a persecutor became her patron and friend. Pepin, when Mayor of the palace, declared himself her strenuous protector.

Anstrudis died in 688 of natural causes. Her feast day is celebrated on 17 October. Anstrudis is remembered in the Gallican and Benedictines calendars.

The ten-petaled sunflower, which blooms in late summer or early fall is identified with Anstrudis.

References

688 deaths
7th-century Frankish saints
Year of birth unknown
Christian female saints of the Middle Ages
Colombanian saints